Ramachandra "Ram" Guha (born 29 April 1958) is an Indian historian, environmentalist, writer and public intellectual whose research interests include social, political, contemporary, environmental and cricket history, and the field of economics. He is an important authority on the history of modern India.

For the years 2011–12, he held a visiting position at the London School of Economics and Political Science (LSE), occupying the Philippe Roman Chair in History and International Affairs. Guha was a visiting professor at the Indian Institute of Science in Bengaluru. The American Historical Association (AHA) has conferred its Honorary Foreign Member prize for the year 2019 on Ramchandra Guha. He is the third Indian historian to be recognised by the association, joining the ranks of Romila Thapar and Jadunath Sarkar, who received the honour in 2009 and 1952, respectively.

Covering a wide range of subjects, Guha has produced three major books of modern India's socio-political history. Among them, Gandhi Before India (2013) and Gandhi: The Years That Changed the World (2018), are the two volumes of biography of Mahatma Gandhi, an icon of the Indian independence movement. The other being India After Gandhi (2007), an account of the history of India from 1947-2017, which received commercial and critical success.

He is a trustee of New India Foundation fellowship programme. He was appointed to BCCI's panel of administrators by the Supreme Court of India in January 2017, but stepped down from his position citing personal reasons five months later. A regular contributor to various academic journals, Guha has also written for The Caravan and Outlook magazines. His book India After Gandhi is read by aspirants of the Indian civil services examination. He is a columnist for The Telegraph, Hindustan Times, and Hindi daily newspaper, Amar Ujala. Guha was listed among the 100 most powerful Indians in 2022 by The Indian Express.

Early life 
Guha was born on 29 April 1958 in Dehradun to a Tamil Brahmin family. He was raised in Dehradun, where his father Subramaniam Ramdas Guha worked at the Forest Research Institute, and his mother was a high-school teacher. While he should have been named Subramaniam Ramachandra in keeping with Tamil name-keeping norms, his teachers at school, presumably while registering his name during admission, were not familiar with these norms, and he came to be known as Ramachandra Guha. He grew up in Dehradun, on the Forest Research Institute campus.

Guha studied at Cambrian Hall and The Doon School. At Doon, he was a contributor to the school newspaper The Doon School Weekly, and edited a publication called History Times along with Amitav Ghosh, who later became a noted writer. He graduated from St. Stephen's College, Delhi with a bachelor's degree in economics in 1977, and completed his master's in economics from the Delhi School of Economics. He then enrolled at the Indian Institute of Management Calcutta, where he earned a Ph.D. in Sociology, focusing on history and prehistory of the Chipko movement. It was later published as  The Unquiet Woods: Ecological Change and Peasant Resistance in the Himalya.

Career
Guha has authored books on a diverse range of subjects including cricket, the environment, politics, and history. Guha was a visiting professor at the Indian Institute of Science for a year beginning in July 2019. He is the trustee of the New India Foundation fellowship programme, which he himself conceptualised in 2004. He has taught at the following universities: Krea, Stanford, Yale, Berlin Institute for Advanced Study, Indian Institute of Science, and University of California at Berkeley. He held the Arné Naess Chair at the University of Oslo, the Indo-American Community Chair at the University of California at Berkeley, and the Philipe Roman Chair in History and International Affairs at the London School of Economics.

History of Modern India 
Guha is the author of India after Gandhi, published by Macmillan and Ecco in 2007. The book was an instant hit and is considered an essential literature in space of modern Indian history. It was chosen Book of the Year by The Economist, The Wall Street Journal and Outlook Magazine. The book was one of the best non-fiction books of the decade (2010–2019) as per The Hindu. The book won the 2011 Sahitya Akademi Award for English for 'narrative history'.

In 2010, Guha wrote the introduction for and edited Makers of Modern India, which profiles 19 Indians who helped in forming and shaping India. The book contains excerpts of their speeches and essays, and covers topics such as religion, caste, colonialism, and nationalism.

In October 2013, he authored Gandhi Before India, the first part of a two-volume biography of Mahatma Gandhi. The biography documents his life from 1869 to 1914, covering events from his childhood to the two decades he spent in South Africa. In 2018, he authored the standalone sequel Gandhi: The Years That Changed the World, 1914-1948, which covers events from when Gandhi returned to India in 1914 to his death in 1948. The book subsumes a lot of new archival material that was discovered only in the 21st century. It has an epilogue which discusses the role of Gandhi in contemporary world politics.

In 2022, Guha authored Rebels Against the Raj, which tells the story of 7 Westerners who came to, lived in, and served India in its quest for independence from the British Raj.

His books are amongst the most sought-after by history students and civil service aspirants in India.

Guha has published acollection of essays, two of them being Patriots and Partisans (2012) and Democrats and Dissenters (2016). In 1999, he was offered to write a biography of Atal Bihari Vajpayee which he declined.

Environment 
Guha earned a PhD on the social history of forestry in Uttarakhand, focusing on the Chipko movement. He produced a biography of the anthropologist Verrier Elwin in 1999, and in the same year wrote a book on environmentalism called Environmentalism: A Global History. In 2006, he authored How Much Should a Person Consume?.

Cricket 
Guha has written extensively on cricket as a journalist and as a historian. His research into the social history of Indian cricket culminated in his work A Corner of a Foreign Field: The Indian History of a British Sport, which was released in 2002. The book charts the development of cricket in India from its inception during the British Raj to its position in contemporary India as the nation's favourite pastime.

He was appointed to BCCI's panel of administrators by the Supreme Court of India on 30 January 2017, as part of the Lodha Committee reforms, only to resign in July of the same year.

In November 2020, he published The Commonwealth of Cricket: A Lifelong Love Affair with the Most Subtle and Sophisticated Game Known to Humankind, a personal account of the transformation of cricket in India across all levels at which the game is played. It presents vivid portraits of local heroes, provincial icons, and international stars through the 50 years he has been following the game. The book blends between memoir, anecdote, reportage, and political critique.

Personal life 

Guha lives in the city of Bengaluru. He is married to Sujata Keshavan, a graphic designer, and they have two children together. Their son, Keshava Guha, became a fiction author with the release of Accidental Magic at the 2019 Bangalore Literature Festival.

Awards and recognition
His essay, "Prehistory of Community Forestry in India", was awarded the Leopold-Hidy Prize of the American Society for Environmental History for 2001.
A Corner of a Foreign Field was awarded the Daily Telegraph Cricket Society Book of the Year prize for 2002.
He won the R. K. Narayan Prize at the Chennai Book Fair in 2003.
The US magazine Foreign Policy named him as one of the top 100 public intellectuals in the world in May 2008. In the poll that followed, Guha was placed 44th.
 Padma Bhushan in 2009, India's third highest civilian award.
2011 Sahitya Akademi Award for India after Gandhi.
In 2014, Guha was awarded an honorary Doctor of Humanities by Yale University
 Fukuoka Asian Culture Prize, 2015
The American Historical Association (AHA) has conferred its Honorary Foreign Member prize for the year 2019 on Ramchandra Guha.

Bibliography
 
 
 
 
 
 
 
 An Indian cricket century (Editor, works of Sujit Mukherjee, 2002)

See also 
 List of Indian writers

Notes

References

External links
 Ramachandra Guha's website

1958 births
Living people
Recipients of the Padma Bhushan in literature & education
Recipients of the Sahitya Akademi Award in English
Indian male essayists
20th-century Indian historians
Scholars from Dehradun
The Doon School alumni
Green thinkers
Delhi School of Economics alumni
St. Stephen's College, Delhi alumni
Indian Tamil people
Indian Institute of Management Calcutta alumni
Cricket historians and writers
Academic staff of the Indian Institute of Science
20th-century Indian essayists
21st-century Indian historians